Chama macerophylla , or the leafy jewel box clam, 
is a species of bivalve mollusc in the family Chamidae.

Distribution
"It can be found along the Atlantic coast of North America, 
ranging from North Carolina to the West Indies."

<div align=center>
Chama macerophylla var. sulphurea
Right and left valve of the same specimen:

</div align=center>

References

Chamidae
Bivalves described in 1791